Bicaz is a town in Neamț County, Western Moldavia, Romania  situated in the eastern Carpathian Mountains near the confluence of the Bicaz and Bistrița Rivers and near Lake Bicaz, an artificial lake formed by the Bicaz Dam on the Bistrița. Bicaz used to be a border town until 1918. Six villages are administered by the town: Capșa, Dodeni, Izvoru Alb, Izvoru Muntelui, Potoci and Secu.

Economy
Before the construction of the dam (1950–1960) the settlement was just a mountain village in Eastern Carpathians where the main economic activity was timber harvesting. By tradition, the tree trunks were linked together, forming a raft (pluta); a raftman used to drive the raft on the Bistrița river downstream to wood processing facilities in Piatra Neamț.

Building the dam created also a horizontal industry: two cement and aggregate plants were built in Bicaz proper and nearby Tașca. This, together with the construction of the Bicaz-Stejaru Hydroelectric Power Station ( to the east) triggered a relative economic boom during the communist period.

The Bicaz cement plant was shut down after the Romanian Revolution of 1989 and is slowly being taken apart. On the other hand, the Tașca cement plant was acquired by the German group HeidelbergCement and was completely overhauled.
The town has also a few timber factories and wood processing facilities.

Access
The town has access to two national roads: DN15  and DN12C  while Bicaz railway station is the terminus station on CFR Line 509 with scheduled daily service to Bucharest North. The town served also as a port with scheduled ferry service with the villages on lake shore in the 1960s and 1970s. Today the facility offers only seasonal leisure cruises.

Tourism
The town is located in the proximity of two important tourist destinations in Romania: the Ceahlău Massif (12 km north) and Cheile Bicazului-Hășmaș National Park (25 km to the west). The impressive Bicaz Dam built on the river Bistrița in the 1950s (one of the biggest in Romania) and the resulting Bicaz Lake are also popular tourist sights.

Natives
 Iuliana Paleu

Image gallery

See also
 Bicaz River
 Bicaz Canyon
 Bicaz Dam
 Lake Bicaz
 Bicaz-Stejaru Hydro Power Plant
 Ceahlău Massif

References

Towns in Romania
Populated places in Neamț County
Localities in Western Moldavia